Theresa Snell Walker (1807 – 17 April 1876) was an Australian sculptor and wax modeller who created medallion portraits.

Born in England, Walker migrated to Australia with her sister, Martha Berkeley, and brother-in-law Captain Charles Berkeley. 

Her work is included in Australia in the collections of the National Portrait Gallery, the Art Gallery of South Australia, the National Gallery of Australia and the State Library of Victoria. An example of her work is also held by the Philadelphia Museum of Art. 

Twice married and twice widowed, Walker died in South Yarra on 17 April 1876.

References

Further reading 

 

1807 births
1876 deaths
19th-century Australian women artists
19th-century Australian artists